The men's marathon at the 1958 European Athletics Championships was held in Stockholm, Sweden, at Stockholms Olympiastadion on 24 August 1958.

Medalists

Results

Final
24 August

Participation
According to an unofficial count, 25 athletes from 17 countries participated in the event.

 (1)
 (1)
 (1)
 (1)
 (2)
 (2)
 (2)
 (1)
 (2)
 (1)
 (2)
 (1)
 (2)
 (1)
 (2)
 (1)
 (2)

References

Marathon
Marathons at the European Athletics Championships
Euro
1958 European Athletics
Men's marathons